Bremotet Moraine is a small morainal area on the northwest side of Zwiesel Mountain, at the point where the glacial flow of the Humboldt Graben meets that of Parizhskaya Kommuna Glacier, in the Wohlthat Mountains. It was first plotted from air photos by the Third German Antarctic Expedition, 1938–39. It was replotted from air photos and surveys by the Sixth Norwegian Antarctic Expedition, 1956–60, and named Bremotet (the "glacier meeting").

References
 

Moraines of Queen Maud Land
Princess Astrid Coast